Teko may refer to:
 Teko people, an Amerindian nation in French Guiana
Emerillon language, their language
 Tektitek language, a Mayan language spoken by the Tektitan people of Huehuetenango, Guatemala